Adrian Stoop (27 March 1883 – 27 November 1957) was an English rugby union player of Dutch descent.

He played 182 times for Harlequins between 1901 and 1939, and won 15 caps for England.

He was president of the Harlequins 1920–1949. The club's ground, The Stoop, is named in his memory. 

His association with Harlequins lasted from his debut against Oxford University in November 1901 until 1950 when he ended his 30-year stint as president of the club. He played his last game in Quins colours in 1939, at the age of 56. He made 182 appearances in total, captained the side 143 times and scored 86 tries, being club captain for 8 consecutive seasons from 1906/07 to 1913/14.

Stoop was born on 27 March 1883 in Cromwell Road, London. His father was Dutch and his mother was half Scottish/half Irish. He went to Dover College in 1896 and on to Rugby School in 1898, where he played for the school team, and then to Oxford University, where he was captain of the rugby team in 1904.

It was whilst he was still at Rugby school that he was asked to join Harlequins. He had also been approached by Blackheath, who at the time were a bigger name than Quins, but he decided to accept the offer from Quins.

In 1905, Stoop made his debut for England against Scotland and it was also against Scotland that he earned the last of his 15 caps in 1912. During this time he captained the national side twice, including the first ever international played at Twickenham in 1910. Had it not been for a broken collarbone in 1907 he would have added to his international appearances.

Stoop is widely credited with revolutionising back play. Previously, the two half backs were designated as "left and right", but Stoop incorporated ideas already being used in Wales and New Zealand to introduce the concept of the Scrum Half and Outside Half. He used these ideas to great success for both Harlequins and England.

As well as being club captain from 1906–1914, Stoop was secretary from 1905–14 and from 1920-38 as well as president from 1920–1950. He was also president of the RFU in 1932 and was a member of the selection committee. In addition to Quins and England he also represented Oxford University, Surrey and The Barbarians.

He was keen beekeeper and ornithologist.

He died on 27 November 1957, aged 74. He is buried at Hartley Wintney, Hampshire, where he had lived for many years.

References 

 Immortal Harlequin: The Story of Adrian Stoop by Ian Cooper (2004) 

1883 births
1957 deaths
Rugby union players from Kensington
English rugby union players
England international rugby union players
People educated at Dover College
People educated at Rugby School
Alumni of University College, Oxford
Barbarian F.C. players
Harlequin F.C. players
Oxford University RFC players
English people of Dutch descent
Middlesex County RFU players
Rugby union fly-halves